The 1937 Chicago Maroons football team was an American football team that represented the University of Chicago during the 1937 Big Ten Conference football season. In their fifth season under head coach Clark Shaughnessy, the Maroons compiled a 1–6 record, finished in ninth place in the Big Ten Conference, and were outscored by their opponents by a combined total of 143 to 45.

Schedule

References

Chicago
Chicago Maroons football seasons
Chicago Maroons football